Lavardin may refer to:

Places 
 Lavardin, Loir-et-Cher, France
 Lavardin, Sarthe, France
 Lavardin, Iran

People 
 Jacques de Lavardin, French humanist translator
 Jean de Beaumanoir (marquis) (1551–1614), the Marquis de Lavardin